Tresfjord or Tresfjorden is a village in Vestnes Municipality in Møre og Romsdal county, Norway. The village is located at the southern end of the fjord, also named Tresfjorden. The river Tressa empties into the Tresfjorden at this village.

Since 2017, Tresfjord has not been considered to be an urban settlement by Statistics Norway, therefore separate population statistics have not been tracked since that time.

The village has a Tine dairy and some other small industries.  The Tresfjord Church is an octagonal church dating back to 1828 and it has an altarpiece from the 14th century.  There is also the Tresfjord Museum, an open-air museum with old houses and equipment from the village.

The European route E136 highway used to run through Tresfjord, but the Tresfjord Bridge opened in 2015 and the highway was re-routed over the bridge, rather than around the shoreline of the fjord, so the highway no longer runs through the village of Tresfjord.

References

Vestnes
Villages in Møre og Romsdal